Qian Shugen (born 29 March 1939) is a general in the People's Liberation Army of China. He was an alternate member of the 13th and 14th Central Committee of the Chinese Communist Party and a member of the 15th and 16th Central Committee of the Chinese Communist Party.

Biography
Qian was born in Wuxi County (now Wuxi), Jiangsu, on 29 March 1939. He enlisted in the People's Liberation Army (PLA) in August 1954, and joined the Chinese Communist Party (CCP) in October 1956. After graduating from Chongqing Artillery School in 1956, he was assigned to the Guangzhou Military Region. In 1979, he entered the PLA Military Academy, where he graduated in 1981. He was commander of the 47th Group Army in March 1985, and held that office until June 1990. As a result of his distinguished service at that war, he was promoted to major general in September 1988. In November 1992, he was promoted to become the chief of staff of the Lanzhou Military Region, succeeding . He was promoted to assistant chief of the PLA General Staff Department in December 1994, and was promoted again to become deputy chief in July 1995.

He was promoted to the rank of major general (shaojiang) in September 1988, lieutenant general (zhongjiang) in July 1994, and general (shangjiang) in June 2000.

References

1939 births
Living people
People from Wuxi
Chiefs of Staff of the Lanzhou Military Region
People's Liberation Army generals from Jiangsu
People's Republic of China politicians from Jiangsu
Chinese Communist Party politicians from Jiangsu
Alternate members of the 13th Central Committee of the Chinese Communist Party
Alternate members of the 14th Central Committee of the Chinese Communist Party
Members of the 15th Central Committee of the Chinese Communist Party
Members of the 16th Central Committee of the Chinese Communist Party